The 2020–21 Ukrainian Men's Volleyball Super League was the 2020–21 edition of the Ukrainian top-tier volleyball championship. Barkom-Kazhany was the defending champion.

This season was the first for Epicentr-Podoliany.

Teams

Squads

Regular season

Standings

Results

Play-offs

Quarter-finals

|}

|}

Semi-finals

|}

|}

|}

|}

Finals

Ukrainian clubs in European competitions

References

External links
Official Ukrainian Volleyball Federation website
Volleyball.ua

Ukraine